Joanna of Bourbon (Jeanne de Bourbon; 3 February 1338 – 6 February 1378) was Queen of France by marriage to King Charles V. She acted as his political adviser and was appointed potential regent in case of a minor regency.

Life

Early life
Born in the Château de Vincennes, Joanna was a daughter of Peter I, Duke of Bourbon, and Isabella of Valois, a half-sister of Philip VI of France.

From October 1340 through at least 1343, negotiations and treaties were made for Joanna to marry Amadeus VI, Count of Savoy. The goal was to bring Savoy more closely into French influence. Following this, she was betrothed to Humbert, Dauphin of Viennois, which also fell through.

Queen
On 8 April 1350, Joanna married her cousin, the future Charles V of France, at Tain-l'Hermitage. Since they were first cousins once removed, their marriage required a papal dispensation.  Born thirteen days apart, they both were 12 years old. When Charles ascended the throne in 1364, Joanna became queen of France.

Queen Joanna and Charles V had somewhat of a strained relationship during his tenure as dauphin because of his infidelity with Biette de Cassinel, but their relationship improved when after he became King, and reportedly, he sometimes confided in her in political and cultural issues and relied on her advice. According to tradition, Joanna was rumored to have taken the poet  for a lover, who was the biological father of the short-lived child she had in 1366.

Queen Joanna was described as mentally fragile, and after the birth of her son Louis in 1373, she suffered a complete mental breakdown. This deeply worried Charles V, who made a pilgrimage and offered many prayers for her recovery. When she did recover and regained her normal state of mind in 1373, Charles V appointed her legal guardian and regent of France should he die when his son and heir was still a minor.

Death and burial
Joanna died at the royal residence Hôtel Saint-Pol in Paris, on 6 February 1378 three days after her 40th birthday, and two days after the birth of her youngest child, Catherine. Froissart recorded that Joanna took a bath against her physicians' advice. Soon after, she went into labour and died two days after giving birth. The king was devastated. Her heart was buried in the Cordeliers Convent and her entrails in the Couvent des Célestins. The Couvent des Célestins in Paris was the most important royal necropolis after the Basilica of St Denis. The rest of her remains were then placed at Saint-Denis.

Issue
Joanna and Charles had eight or nine children. Two of them reached adulthood:
 Joanna (end September 1357 – 21 October 1360, Saint Antoine-des-Champs Abbey, Paris), interred at Saint-Antoine-des-Champs Abbey.
 Bonne (1358 – 7 November 1360, Palais Royal, Paris), interred beside her older sister.
 Joanna (Château de Vincennes, 6 June 1366 – 21 December 1366, Hôtel de Saint-Pol, Paris), interred at Saint Denis Basilica.
 Charles VI (3 December 1368 – 22 October 1422), King of France.
 Marie (Paris, 27 February 1370 – June 1377, Paris).
 Louis (13 March 1372 – 23 November 1407), Duke of Orléans.
 Isabella (Paris, 24 July 1373 – 23 February 1378, Paris).
 John (1374/76 – died young).
 Catherine (Paris, 4 February 1378 – November 1388, buried at Abbaye De Maubuisson, France), m. John of Berry, Count of Montpensier (son of John, Duke of Berry).

Ancestry

Notes

References

Sources

External links

|-

French queens consort
House of Valois
House of Bourbon (France)
Dauphines of Viennois
Dauphines of France
Duchesses of Normandy
1338 births
1378 deaths
People from Vincennes
Burials at the Basilica of Saint-Denis
Deaths in childbirth
14th-century French women
14th-century French people